Emre Uğur Uruç (born 10 April 1994) is a Turkish footballer who plays as a right back for Bayrampaşa.

References

External links
 
 
 

1994 births
People from Seyhan
Living people
Turkish footballers
Turkey under-21 international footballers
Association football defenders
Adanaspor footballers
Giresunspor footballers
Adana Demirspor footballers
Ankara Keçiörengücü S.K. footballers
Bayrampaşaspor footballers
Süper Lig players
TFF First League players
TFF Third League players